Simari is an Italian surname which is most prevalent in the southeastern region of Calabria and is also to be found among the American and especially Argentinian Italian diaspora. Notable people with the surname include:
 Cristian Javier Simari Birkner (born 1980), Argentinian alpine skier
 Guillermo Simari, Argentine computer scientist
 László Simari, Hungarian sprint canoer
 Leopoldo Simari (1889–1941), Argentinian actor
 Macarena Simari Birkner (born 1984), Argentinian alpine skier
 María Belén Simari Birkner (born 1982), Argentinian alpine skier
 Tomás Simari (1897–1981), Argentinian actor

References

Italian-language surnames
Surnames of Italian origin